T. S. Rawat ministry may refer to:

 Trivendra Singh Rawat ministry, the 9th government of Uttarakhand headed by Trivendra Singh Rawat from 2017 to 2021
 Tirath Singh Rawat ministry, the 10th government of Uttarakhand headed by Tirath Singh Rawat from 2021 onwards

See also
 Trivendra Singh Rawat
 Tirath Singh Rawat